The 250s (pronounced two-fifties or two-hundred and fifties) was a decade that ran from January 1, 250, to December 31, 259.

Significant people

References